Nadezhda Andreyevna may refer to:

Nadezhda Andreyevna Durova (1783–1866), Russian female wartime cross-dresser
Nadezhda Andreyevna Obukhova (1886–1961), Russian opera singer
Nadezhda Andreyevna Tolokonnikova (born 1989), Russian political activist